Buxa Fort is located at an altitude of  in the Buxa Tiger Reserve, in the Kalchini CD block in the Alipurduar subdivision of the Alipurduar district, in West Bengal, India. The Bhutan King used the fort to protect the portion connecting Tibet with India, via Bhutan. Still later during the unrest in the occupation of Tibet, hundreds of refugees arrived at the place and used the then abandoned fort as a place of refuge.

History
Its origin is uncertain. Before the occupation of the fort by the British, it was a point of contention between the King of Bhutan and the Cooch Kings.

British occupation
The British on invitation of the Cooch King intervened and captured the fort which was formally handed over to the British on November 11, 1865 as part of Treaty of Sinchula. The British reconstructed the fort from its bamboo wood structure to stone structure. The fort was to later be used as a high security prison and detention camp in the 1930s; it was the most notorious and unreachable prison in India after the Cellular Jail in Andaman. Nationalist revolutionaries belonging to the Anushilan Samiti and Yugantar group such as Krishnapada Chakraborty were imprisoned there in the 1930s. Forward Bloc leader and ex-Law Minister of West Bengal, Amar Prasad Chakraborty, was also imprisoned at Buxa Fort in 1943. Besides, some communist revolutionaries and intellectuals like Nirad Chakraborty, Shibshankar Mitra and Satish Pakrashi. The poet Subhash Mukhopadhyay was also imprisoned here in the 1950s. Later he gave a vivid description of this jail in one of his stories - মেঘের গায়ে জেলখানা (Megher Gaye JailKhana) in his আমার বাংলা কাব্যগ্রন্থ।

Tibetan refugee crisis
Drepung was one of the most celebrated monasteries in Tibet, and with over 10,000 monks before the Chinese invasion. But in March 1959, Chinese troops tasked with quelling the Tibetan uprising moved aggressively against the monastery; Only a few hundred monks escaped to India. These expatriate monks, representing all the diverse Tibetan orders, first set up a monastic study center and refugee camp in Buxa Fort, on the grounds of the jungle-bound former prison camp.

In 1966, the Indian Ministry of External Affairs was alerted to the conditions of the Buxa refugee camps, and it became apparent that the Tibetan refugees would have to be relocated to a more hospitable place. Initially reluctant, a message from the Dalai Lama, urging them to think of the future and to strive for sufficiency, and the option of settling near other Tibetan refugees convinced the monks to move, and in 1971 the monks moved to their new locations at Bylakuppe and Mundgod in the state of Karnataka.

Geography

Location

Area overview
Alipurduar district is covered by two maps. It is an extensive area in the eastern end of the Dooars in West Bengal. It is undulating country, largely forested, with numerous rivers flowing down from the outer ranges of the Himalayas in Bhutan. It is a predominantly rural area with 79.38% of the population living in the rural areas. The district has 1 municipal town and 20 census towns and that means that 20.62% of the population lives in the urban areas. The scheduled castes and scheduled tribes, taken together, form more than half the population in all the six community development blocks in the district. There is a high concentration of tribal people (scheduled tribes) in the three northern blocks of the district.

Note: The map alongside presents some of the notable locations in the subdivision. All places marked in the map are linked in the larger full screen map.

Trekking
The following routes are popular among tourists and nature lovers –
Santalabari to Buxa Fort 
Buxa Fort to Rovers point 
Santalabari to Roopang valley 
Buxa Fort to Lepchakha 
Buxa Fort to Chunabhati

Buxa Fort picture gallery

References

British colonial prisons in Asia
Forts in West Bengal
Museums in West Bengal
Tourist attractions in Alipurduar district